BulletBoys is an American hard rock/glam metal band formed in Los Angeles in 1986. The group's original lineup was composed of singer Marq Torien (formerly of Ratt, King Kobra, and Kagny & the Dirty Rats), guitarist Mick Sweda (formerly of King Kobra), bassist Lonnie Vencent (formerly of King Kobra), and drummer Jimmy D'Anda. The group released two successful albums and had a number of singles featured on MTV between 1988 and 1991. From the 1990s onward, the group went through numerous lineup changes, with Torien as the only consistent member. Their most recent album From Out of the Skies was released in 2018. The original lineup reunited for one-off shows in 2011 and 2019.

History 
Platinum-selling artists BulletBoys were formed in 1986 in Los Angeles, California, by former King Kobra members Marq Torien (also formerly of Ratt) on vocals, Mick Sweda on guitar, Lonnie Vencent on bass and Jimmy D'Anda on drums. The group were strongly influenced by AC/DC and Van Halen with Torien drawing comparisons to Van Halen singer David Lee Roth. After signing a deal with Warner Bros., the group released their debut album BulletBoys in 1988 with the album peaking at number 34 on the Billboard 200. The group released two singles, a cover of the classic O'Jays tune, "For the Love of Money" (which peaked at number 30 on the Mainstream Rock Chart and number 78 on the Billboard Hot 100), and "Smooth Up in Ya" (which peaked at number 23 on the Mainstream Rock Chart and number 71 on the Billboard Hot 100), with both receiving airplay on MTV. They released their second album, Freakshow, in 1991; however, the album only peaked at number 69 on the Billboard 200. The single "Hang on St. Christopher," a cover of the Tom Waits song, peaked at number 22 on the Mainstream Rock Chart. The group released their final album with Warner Bros., titled Za-Za, a name suggested by D'Anda taken from The Godfather Part III character Joey Zasa, in 1993, but it failed to chart, as well as the album's singles. Both Sweda and D'Anda left the group the same year. The group continued and released Acid Monkey in 1995 through Swordholio/Perris Records however they disbanded soon after.

In 1998, the group reformed, with Torien and Vencent adding former Guns N' Roses drummer Steven Adler and future Guns N' Roses guitarist DJ Ashba briefly, with a tour of the US planned with Faster Pussycat, Bang Tango and Enuff Z'nuff. In 1999, Ashba left the group to form Beautiful Creatures with Bang Tango singer Joe Lesté while Adler left also sometime after, going on to form Adler's Appetite in 2003. A compilation album, titled Burning Cats and Amputees, was released in 2000, through Deadline Records.

In 2002, Vencent was rumored to be involved in a tour of Europe with former Anthrax members Joey Belladonna, Dan Spitz and former W.A.S.P. drummer Stet Howland while former drummer Jimmy D'Anda formed the group Zen Lunatic with John Corabi (formerly of The Scream and Mötley Crüe) and Stevo Bruno (formerly of Revel 8).  D'Anda went on to tour with George Lynch as part of Lynch Mob and opening up for Dio around the states during 2001. In 2009 D'Anda played drums for former Warrant singer Jani Lane doing shows in California, New Mexico and Nevada.  In September 2010, Jimmy performed at the Groove Remains the Same, a tribute to John Bonham.

The BulletBoys cover of The O'Jay's R&B song from 1973 entitled "For the Love of Money" appears briefly in the 2003 TV movie "Behind the Camera: The Unauthorized Story of 'Three's Company'".

Remaining members Torien and Vencent, released the group's fifth album (their first in 7 years), titled Sophie, in 2003 which featured a guest appearance by former Skid Row singer Sebastian Bach. A tour was to follow, with L.A. Guns, however this was soon canceled after an incident with the group's bus driver. Guitarist Keri Kelli, who was filling for Tracii Guns in L.A. Guns, performed with BulletBoys before leaving at the insistence of L.A. Guns drummer Steve Riley. Jason Hook was briefly a member of BulletBoys during this time. In 2004, Torien was in line to tour with Stephen Pearcy (formerly of Ratt), Joey Belladonna (formerly of Anthrax), Ron Keel (Keel, IronHorse) and Jason McMaster (Dangerous Toys, Watchtower) as part of the "Bastards of Metal" tour. However, this tour never came to pass.

In January 2006, the group were announced as support, along with Bang Tango, to Stephen Pearcy on his tour, however they soon pulled out while they performed at the Raven's Heart benefit concert, which featured members of Guns N' Roses, Queens of the Stone Age and Dio among others performing also. Torien also announced that BulletBoys were to reunite and record a new album stating:

Drummer Jimmy D'Anda stated that none of the original members were involved in the reunion album soon after, while Torien stated that only D'Anda was "resistant to the idea" with the other former members (Sweda and Vincent) willing to return. However, a reunion failed to materialize. BulletBoys went on to tour with the Tracii Guns led L.A. Guns and announced plans for a live album as well as an album of new material in 2007. The group released the live album, titled Behind the Orange Curtain, on April 3, 2007, through Crash Music while they were one of the confirmed acts for Rocklahoma in July of the same year. Also in 2006, the song "Hard As A Rock" appeared briefly in the movie Beerfest.

In 2009, they released their sixth album, titled 10c Billionaire, on Chavis Records. The material was originally written in 2006 with plans, by Torien, for a new project using the same name. However, they eventually released it under the BulletBoys moniker. In October, original bassist Lonnie Vincent returned to the group while guitarist Tony Marcus (XYZ, Arcade, Vicious Delite) was also added to the lineup with a tour of the US announced soon after.

In January 2010, the group were confirmed to play the Stockholm Rock Out Festival on April 30 of the same year. In March, the song "Smooth Up In Ya" appeared briefly in the movie Hot Tub Time Machine. In April, the group were confirmed to play another Festival, Rock N America, that took place July 23–25.

On August 28, 2011, former drummer Johnny Giosa died in a car accident in Los Angeles at the age of 42.

On December 12, 2019, BulletBoys announced that their original lineup would be reuniting. The reunion kicked off with a hometown gig on December 30, 2019, at the Whisky a Go Go. The reunion lasted until January 2022 when drummer Jimmy D'Anda and guitarist Mick Sweda left the band due to "toxicity" within the band. The newest lineup of the band was announced shortly after, which would consist of guitarist Ira Black, bassist Brad Lang, and drummer Fred Aching, thus alleging original bassist Lonnie Vencent had also left the band.

Personnel

Current members 
 Marq Torien – vocals, guitars, bass, congas (1987–present)
 Ira Black – guitars (2022–present)
 Brad Lang– bass (2022–present)
 Fred Aching – drums (2022–present)

Former members 

 Lonnie Vencent – bass, backing vocals (1987–2000, 2006, 2009–2014, 2019–2022)
 Mick Sweda – guitars, backing vocals (1987–1993, 1999–2000, 2011, 2019–2022)
 Jimmy D'Anda – drums, backing vocals (1987–1993, 1999–2000, 2011, 2019–2022)
 Tommy Pittam – guitars (1993–1998)
 Robby Karras – drums (1993–1998) (died 2012)
 Tony Marcus – guitars (1993, 2009–2010)
 DJ Ashba – guitars (1998–1999)
 Steven Adler – drums (1998–1999)
 Jason Hook – guitars (2000–2002)
 Melvin Brannon II – bass (2000–2002)
 Brent Fitz – drums (2000–2001)
 Vik Foxx – drums (2000)
 Scott Taylor – bass (2002–2006)
 Keri Kelli – guitars (2002–2004)
 Denny Johnson – guitars (2004–2006)
 Ryche Green – drums (2005–2010, 2012–2013)
 Charlie Wayne Morrill – guitars (2006–2007)
 Michael Thomas – guitars (2006, 2007–2008)
 Lenny Round – bass, co-lead vocals (2006, 2007)

 Stephen Allan – bass (2007–2009)
 Danny Seven – drums (2007–2008, 2008–2009)
 Danny Watts – guitars (2007–2008)
 Scott Griffin – bass (2007)
 Don "Dish" Bish – drums  (2007) 
 Rob Lane – bass (2008–2009)
 Dave Weeks – bass (2008, 2009)
 Tory Stoffregen – guitars (2009)
 Nick Rozz – guitars  (2010–2011, 2012–2019)
 Troy Patrick Farrell – drums (2010–2011)
 Johnny Giosa – drums (2010) (died 2011)
 Chad MacDonald – bass, backing vocals  (2011, 2014–2019)
 Hal Wilner – iceman  (2021–2022)
 Chris Holmes – guitars (2011)
 Stephen Jude Mills – drums (2012–2014, 2015, 2019)
 Shawn Duncan – drums  (2014–2016, 2019)
 Joaquin Revuelta – drums  (2016–2018)
 Anthony "Tiny" Biuso – drums  (2018–2019)
 Phil Varone – drums (2018)

Discography

Studio albums 
 BulletBoys (1988)
 Freakshow (1991)
 Za-Za (1993)
 Acid Monkey (1995)
 Sophie (2003)
 10¢ Billionaire (2009)
 Rocked and Ripped (2011)
 Elefante' (2015)
 From Out of the Skies (2018)

Live albums 
 Behind the Orange Curtain (2007)

Compilation albums 
 Burning Cats and Amputees (2000)
 Smooth Up in Ya: The Best of the Bulletboys (2006)

Box sets 
 The Warner Albums 1988–1993  (2021)

Singles

See also 
List of glam metal bands and artists

References

External links 

 Official website

1987 establishments in California
Glam metal musical groups from California
Hard rock musical groups from California
Musical groups established in 1987
Musical groups from Los Angeles